Vlad is a Romanian male given name. It is more commonly a nativized hypocorism of Vladislav and can also be used as a surname. It may refer to:

Given name

People 

 Vlad I of Wallachia, voivode (prince) of Wallachia
 Vlad II Dracul (before 1395 – 1448), voivode of Wallachia
 Vlad the Impaler (1428/31 – 1476/77), voivode of Wallachia as Vlad III, inspiration for the character Count Dracula
 Vlad Călugărul (before 1425? – 1495), voivode of Wallachia as Vlad IV, half-brother of Vlad the Impaler
 Vlad cel Tânăr (1494–1512), voivode of Wallachia as Vlad V
 Vlad VI Înecatul (c. 1508 – 1532), voivode of Wallachia
 Vlad Vintilă de la Slatina (died 1535), voivode of Wallachia as Vlad VII
 Vlad Achim (born 1989), Romanian footballer
 Vlad Bădălicescu (born 1988), Romanian rugby union footballer
 Vlad Bujor (born 1989), Romanian footballer
 Vlad Chiricheș (born 1989), Romanian footballer
 Vlad Danale (born 1998), Romanian footballer
 Vlad Dragomir (born 1999), Romanian footballer
 Vladimir Vlad Filat (born 1969), Moldovan businessman and politician, former Prime Minister of Moldova
 Vlad Goian (born 1970), Moldovan football manager and former player
 Vladimir Guerrero (born 1975), Dominican retired Major League Baseball player
 Vladimir Guerrero Jr. (born 1999), Canadian Major League Baseball player, son of the above
 Vlad Hagiu, (born 1963), Romanian water polo coach
 Vlad Ioviță (1935–1983), Moldovan writer
 Vladimir Vlad Ivanov (born 1969), Romanian actor
 Vlado Kreslin (born 1953), Slovene singer, songwriter and musician
 Vlad Lyubovny (born 1973), commonly known as DJ Vlad, Ukrainian-born American interviewer, journalist and director
 Vlad Miriță (born 1981), Romanian singer
 Vlad Moldoveanu (born 1988), Romanian basketball player
 Vlad Morar (born 1993), Romanian footballer
 Vlad Munteanu (born 1981), Romanian retired footballer
 Vlad Muțiu (born 1995), Romanian football goalkeeper
 Vlad Nistor (rugby union) (born 1994), Romanian rugby union player
 Vlad Olteanu (born 1996), Romanian footballer
 Vlad Rusu (born 1990), Romanian footballer
 Vlad Sokolovskiy (born 1991), Russian singer
 Vladislav Vlad Topalov (born 1985), Russian singer, dancer and actor

Fictional characters 
 Vlad Plasmius, in the Nickelodeon TV series Danny Phantom
 Vlad Taltos, in Steven Brust's Dragaera novels
 Vlad Vladikoff, in the Dr. Seuss children's books
 Vlad, in the Ender's Game series
 Vlad Glebov, in the Grand Theft Auto IV video game
 Vlad, in the Hack/Slash comic series
 Vlad Dracula, in the CBBC show Young Dracula

Stage name 
 Vlad (musician), born Volodymyr DeBriansky in 1972, Ukrainian-born American guitarist, composer, songwriter and music producer
 Vlad Stashevsky, Russian pop singer Vladislav Stanislavovich Tverdohlebov (born 1974)

Surname 
 Alexandru Vlad (born 1989), Romanian footballer
 Andrei Vlad (born 1999), Romanian football goalkeeper
 Dan Vlad (born 1983), Romanian rugby union player
 Marcel Vlad (born 1948), Romanian wrestler
 Marina Marta Vlad (born 1949), Romanian composer
 Nicu Vlad (born 1963), Romanian weightlifter
 Roman Vlad (1919–2013), Italian composer, pianist and musicologist

Romanian masculine given names
Hypocorisms